Kripal Singh Shekhawat (1922-2008) was a renowned craftsman and ceramist of India. He was famous for his skills in Blue Pottery of Jaipur and is credited for the revival of that art in India.

Life and career
Born in Mau Rajasthan in 1922, he studied original painting at the Shanti Niketan in West Bengal and later did a diploma in Oriental Arts from the Tokyo University, Japan.

He was also the director of Sawai Ram Singh Shilpa Kala Mandir at Jaipur where he taught Indian painting and Blue Pottery.

He was conferred the Padma Shri in 1974 and was also honoured with the title Shilp Guru by the Government of India in 2002. Unknown to many, Kripal Singh is renowned for his illustrations in the original document of the Constitution of India.

He died on 15 February 2008 in Jaipur.

Art

A distinguished traditional artist, Kripal Singh's paintings are poetic. They carry the expression of the traditional and early styles of painting with bold innovations in a delicate and refined manner. His works also claim an important historical place in the organic evolution of traditional paintings. There is no one who can create his style of painting with great detail he has shown the birds, clothes, animals flowers which shows the dedication with which he creates  a real painting.

Legacy
He revived the art of blue pottery, with the help of patrons such as Kamladevi Chattopadhyay and Rajmata Gayatri Devi. He learnt all the secrets of the nearly extinct art as it had been perfected in Jaipur in the 19th century, and made many changes to make it a modern practice. His hard work helped re-establish an entire tradition.

Despite rumours to the contrary, Kripal Kumbh, the pottery studio founded by Kripal Singh Shekhawat is still in operation. It is run by his wife Sajjan Kanwar assisted by her three daughters, Minakshi, Himani and Kumud Rathore.

Works 
 Sharma, Bhawani Shankar, and Kripal Singh Shekhawat. 2007. Kripal Singh Shekhawat: virtuoso of line and colour. New Delhi: Lalit Kala Akademi. Chiefly color reproductions of the works of Indian artist Kripal Singh Shekhawat; includes brief biographical and critical text.
 Khandalavala, Karl J., and Kripal Singh Shekhawat. 1974. Wall paintings from Amber. New Delhi: Lalit Kalā Akademi. Portfolio comprising copies of the now damaged murals made by Kirpal Singh Shekhawat.
 Shesh, Hemant. 1984.Kripal Singh Shekhawat (In Hindi): Artist's detailed Monograph, Jaipur: Rajasthan Lalit Kala Academy includes biography and critical analysis on his art and pottery.

References

External links 
 
 Blue Pottery by Shri Kripal Singh
 

Indian male painters
Indian potters
Recipients of the Padma Shri in arts
Rajasthani people
University of Tokyo alumni
2008 deaths
1922 births
Artists from Jaipur
Visva-Bharati University alumni
Art educators
Indian ceramists
20th-century Indian painters
Painters from Rajasthan
20th-century ceramists